Diphosphene is a compound having the formula (PH)2. It exists as two geometric isomers, E and Z. Diphosphene is also the parent member of the entire class of diphosphene compounds with the formula (PR)2, where R is an organyl group.

References

Phosphorus hydrides